The 2016–17 season was Real Club Deportivo Mallorca's 82nd season in existence and the club's 4th season back in the second division of Spanish football. In addition to the domestic league, RCD Mallorca participated in this season's edition of the Copa del Rey. The season covers the period from 1 July 2016 to 30 June 2017.

Competitions

Overview

Segunda División

League table

Results summary

Results by round

Matches

Copa del Rey

References

External links 
Official website 
English website
Futbolme team profile 
BDFutbol team profile
:ca:Trofeu Ciutat de Palma de Futbol

RCD Mallorca seasons
Mallorca